The 1970 FIVB Men's World Championship was the seventh edition of the tournament, organised by the world's governing body, the FIVB. It was held from 29 September to 12 October 1970 in Bulgaria.

Qualification

* South Korea, India, Mexico and Algeria were replaced by Mongolia, North Korea, United States and Guinea.

Venues

Teams

Group A
 
 
 
 
 
 

Group B
 
 
 
 
 
 

Group C
 
 
 
 
 
 

Group D

Results

First round

Pool A
Location: Sofia

|}

|}

Pool B
Location: Yambol

|}

|}

Pool C
Location: Haskovo

|}

|}

Pool D
Location: Kardzhali

|}

|}

Final round
The results and the points of the matches between the same teams that were already played during the first round are taken into account for the final round.

17th–24th places
Location: Haskovo

|}

|}

9th–16th places
Location: Yambol

|}

|}

Final places
Venue: Festivalna Hall, Sofia

|}

|}

Final standing

References

External links
 Results at FIVB.org
 Federation Internationale de Volleyball

FIVB Men's World Championship
V
V
FIVB Volleyball Men's World Championship
1970 in Bulgarian sport
1970s in Sofia
September 1970 sports events in Europe
October 1970 sports events in Europe